Harriet George Barclay (31 August 1901 - 25 May 1990) was an American botanist, plant ecologist, nature conservationist, and artist.

Biography
Barclay was a professor at the University of Tulsa. She later became Chair of the Botany Department in 1953.

She also taught at universities across America: Colorado, Arkansas, Illinois, and North Carolina.

Harriet George Barclay collected over 35,000 plants from 6 different continents, including 15,000 different specimens from South America while conducting research there.

She has over 2,000 specimens on record as identified or collected.

Degrees
 B.A., Botany, University of Minnesota, 1923
 M.A., Botany, University of Minnesota, 1924 
 Ph.D. Plant Ecology, University of Chicago, 1928 
 B.A. Art, University of Tulsa, 1945

Positions
 Chair of the Botany Department, Tulsa University, OK
 Trustee, Philbrook Museum of Art, OK
 President, Tulsa Garden Club, OK
 Member, Tulsa Artists Guild, OK

Accomplishments
Barclay was instrumental in getting the Nature Conservancy in Washington, D.C. to lease land to the University of Tulsa for Redbud Valley Nature Preserve - the first project of its kind in Oklahoma.

Awards and honors
 “Woman of the Year,” American Women in Radio and Television, 1959
 “Conservationist of the Year,” Oklahoma Wildlife Federation, 1971
 "Distinguished Service Award," Henry Kendall College of Arts and Sciences, Tulsa University, 1975
 "Oklahoma Hall of Fame," 1976

Interesting facts
 10 plants are named after Barclay.

Quotes
"A trip has no value if you come home and forget it" - Harriet George Barclay.

See also

University of Minnesota
University of Chicago
University of Tulsa
Philbrook Museum of Art

References

1901 births
1990 deaths
Plant ecologists
American environmentalists
American ecologists
Women ecologists
Scientists from Oklahoma
American watercolorists
American women biologists
American women scientists
20th-century American women artists
American women botanists
American botanists
20th-century American women